For Husband's Only is 1918 American silent comedy-drama film and directed by Lois Weber and her husband Phillips Smalley. The film was distributed by Universal Pictures. The film was apparently made in late 1917 but not released until just before the end of World War I. For Husband's Only is now considered to be a lost film.

Plot
As described in a film magazine, just out of convent, Toni Wilde (Harris) becomes the inspiration of millionaire bachelor Rolin Van D'Arcy (Cody) and when he kisses her, she believes herself to be engaged to him. However, she is rudely awakened from this dream and, after finding out that Van D'Arcy is not a marrying man, she marries Samuel Dodge (Goodwins), who is the butt of all jokes in his set. Dodge is delighted and does everything in his power to make her happy. Toni then decides to play with Van D'Arcy to make him regret his actions. Van D'Arcy comes to the point where he wants Toni more than anything else, but his plans to win her prove futile. When Toni believes that she has lost her husband, she realizes that she loves him, and when she finds her fears are unfounded she is very happy.

Cast
 Mildred Harris as Toni Wilde
 Lew Cody as Rolin Van D'Arcy (credited as Lewis J. Cody)
 Fred Goodwins as Samuel Dodge
 Kathleen Kirkham as Mrs. Ellis
 Henry A. Barrows 
 Esther Ralston as Bit part (uncredited)

References

External links
 
 
Lantern slide to film(Wayback Machine)

1918 films
1918 comedy-drama films
1910s English-language films
American silent feature films
American black-and-white films
Films directed by Lois Weber
Lost American films
Universal Pictures films
1918 lost films
1910s American films
Lost comedy-drama films
Silent American comedy-drama films